Saint-Caradec-Trégomel is a commune in the Morbihan department of Brittany in north-western France.

Demographics

Inhabitants of Saint-Caradec-Trégomel are called in French Caradocéens.

Geography

Saint-Caradec-Trégomel is border by Le Croisty to the north, by Ploërdut and Lignol to the east, by Kernascléden and Berné to the south and by Priziac to the west. Historically it belongs to Vannetais and Pays Pourlet.

Map

Gallery

See also
Communes of the Morbihan department

References

External links

 Mayors of Morbihan Association 

Saintcaradectregomel